Zimdancehall is a subgenre of reggae/dancehall music from Zimbabwe. The traditional way of message delivery is through chanting. Zimdancehall became more popular after the fall of the Urban Grooves genre. Popular pioneers of Zimdancehall include Winky D, Sniper Storm, Daddie Distress, Ras Tavonga (Jah Bless), Freeman HKD, Lewaz Skattah to mention a few.

History 

Zimdancehall started in the late 1980s with the rising up of local sound systems. The popularity of these recordings led to more studio recordings. By the end of the 90s, a number of local youths were recording singles and albums independently and reggae bands like Cruxial Mix (Trevor Hall) and Black Roots holding regular weekly shows to showcase artists. 

The genre was cast as a copycat of Jamaican culture and way of life. Recording studios shunned it saying it does not appeal or sell. The emergence of independent studios and the arrival of urban grooves in 2001 opened doors for many artists with the release of various artists albums. In 2004 a hardcore dancehall album with lyrics in Shona rather than English or patois proved popular.

2005 saw a series of hits by Winky D.  In 2006, another artist Slaggy Yout based in the UK renamed it to Zimdancehall after creating a website dedicated to the genre. This coincided with political and economic sanctions in Zimbabwe making internet access affordable for many artists. Tracks were sent by post to the UK or uploaded in internet cafes with funding from the website. Artists weren't getting any airplay and promoters were not booking or marketing them. Individual promoters arranged shows in ghettos. 

It has become a stronghold of Zimbabwean music attracting listeners of all ages, representing almost 60 per cent of Zimbabwean radio airplay.

Notable Zimdancehall musicians 
 Freeman HKD
 Judgement Yard
 Killer T
 Soul Jah Love
 Winky D
 Tocky Vibes
 Levels Chillspot

See also
 Music of Zimbabwe
 Stewart Nyamayaro

References

Zimbabwean music